Bartłomiej Topa (born 26 May 1967, Nowy Targ, Poland) is a Polish actor. He appeared in more than seventy films since 1990.

Selected filmography

References

External links 

1967 births
Living people
Polish male film actors
Polish film actors
Polish television actors
Polish male stage actors
Polish film producers
Łódź Film School alumni